Archaeornithipus was a genus of large bird ichnogenus discovered in Spain. The tracks date back to the Berriasian stage of the Cretaceous, making them among the oldest bird trace fossils in the world.

Footnotes

Bird trace fossils